V. orientalis  may refer to:
 Vespa orientalis, the Oriental hornet, an insect species 
 Vidua orientalis, the Sahel paradise whydah or Northern paradise whydah, a small songbird species found in west Africa
 Vibrio orientalis, a Gram-negative bacterium species in the genus Vibrio

See also
 Orientalis (disambiguation)